Polní Voděrady is a municipality and village in Kolín District in the Central Bohemian Region of the Czech Republic. It has about 200 inhabitants.

History
The first written mention of Polní Voděrady is from 1088, when it was owned by the Vyšehrad Chapter.

References

Villages in Kolín District